Transbus may refer to:

 Transbus International, a division of Dennis Specialist Vehicles
 The Transbus Program, a 1970s United States federal government program to develop a standardized transit bus